BMCE Bank International, formerly known as MediCapital Bank Plc is an international bank specialising in Africa.

BMCE Bank International is a multinational full service investment and wholesale bank, headquartered in London with an international network in Europe and Africa. Its core business divisions are Capital Markets, Corporate Banking and Advisory.

History 
BMCE Bank International was launched in 2007 under the name MediCapital Bank as the international wholesale arm of BMCE Group and started trading in February 2008. On September 1, 2010 MediCapital Bank changed its name to BMCE Bank International

BMCE Group is part of the Finance.com Group, one of the largest private financial groups in Morocco. Operating both domestically and internationally, BMCE Group has four main businesses: retail banking, corporate banking, investment banking and international banking and a long experience of doing business in Africa through its on-the-ground network of offices in fifteen countries across North, West, East and Central Africa. It is listed on the Casablanca Stock Exchange with a market capitalisation of c. $US 5 billion (as at 31 December 2009).

Services 
BMCE Bank International currently has three core business divisions: Capital Markets, Corporate Banking, and Advisory.

Capital Markets 

The Treasury and Capital Markets division's main products offering are foreign exchange & money markets, equities sales & trading, private equity and credit trading & structuring.

Corporate Banking 
The division offers:
 Structured finance services such as project finance, large-scale export finance, commodity finance, asset-backed finance, acquisitions and leverage finance, working capital needs facilities
 Trade finance and Guarantees including letters of credit, forfeiting, clearing accounts, interest-bearing accounts, foreign payment and collection solutions

Advisory 

The Advisory division (MediCapital Finance) resulted from the acquisition of Pall Mall Capital, a corporate finance boutique based in Paris, in July 2008.
Its core business focuses on South-South mid-cap transactions and on companies based in North / West Africa. The team also specialises in cross-border transactions and provides financial services, including M&A advisory, equity restructuring & fund raising and privatisation advisory.

See also 

BMCE Bank

References

External links 
 "IFC Partners with BMCE Bank International Plc UK to Support Trade in Africa" (September 1, 2021) – International Finance Corporation

Banks based in the City of London
Companies based in the City of Westminster
British companies established in 2007